The 1970 CFL season is considered to be the 17th season in modern-day Canadian football, although it is officially the 13th Canadian Football League season.

CFL news in 1970
3M Tartan Turf was installed at Vancouver's Empire Stadium, making it the first CFL venue to have artificial turf. The first sod was preserved and sent to Hamilton to be used as part of the future Canadian Football Hall of Fame building. The first CFL All-Star Game was held since 1958. The Montreal Alouettes are sold to former Ottawa Rough Rider owner Sam Berger, who changes their colours to green, white and red, and it is the beginning of a great dynasty in Montreal.

Regular season standings

Final regular season standings
Note: GP = Games Played, W = Wins, L = Losses, T = Ties, PF = Points For, PA = Points Against, Pts = Points

Bold text means that they have clinched the playoffs.
Saskatchewan and Hamilton have first round byes.

Grey Cup playoffs
Note: All dates in 1970

Conference Semi-Finals

Conference Finals

Playoff bracket

Grey Cup Championship

1970 CFL All-Stars

Offence
QB – Ron Lancaster, Saskatchewan Roughriders
RB – Bill Symons, Toronto Argonauts
RB – Hugh McKinnis, Calgary Stampeders
RB – Jim Evenson, BC Lions
TE – Herman Harrison, Calgary Stampeders
SE – Tommy Joe Coffey, Hamilton Tiger-Cats
F – Jim Thorpe, Toronto Argonauts
C – Ted Urness, Saskatchewan Roughriders
OG – Charlie Bray, Toronto Argonauts
OG – Bill Danychuk, Hamilton Tiger-Cats
OG – Ken Sugarman, BC Lions
OT – Bill Frank, Winnipeg Blue Bombers
OT – Ellison Kelly, Hamilton Tiger-Cats

Defence
DT – Angelo Mosca, Hamilton Tiger-Cats
DT – Greg Pipes, Edmonton Eskimos
DE – Steve Smear, Montreal Alouettes
DE – Ed Harrington, Toronto Argonauts
LB – Wayne Harris, Calgary Stampeders
LB – Jerry Campbell, Ottawa Rough Riders
LB – Greg Findlay, BC Lions
DB – John Wydareny, Edmonton Eskimos
DB – Garney Henley, Hamilton Tiger-Cats
DB – Al Phaneuf, Montreal Alouettes
DB – Al Marcelin, Ottawa Rough Riders
DB – Marv Luster, Toronto Argonauts

1970 Eastern All-Stars

Offence
QB – Gary Wood, Ottawa Rough Riders
RB – Bill Symons, Toronto Argonauts
RB – Moses Denson, Montreal Alouettes
RB – Dave Fleming, Hamilton Tiger-Cats
TE – Mel Profit, Toronto Argonauts
SE – Tommy Joe Coffey, Hamilton Tiger-Cats
F – Jim Thorpe, Toronto Argonauts
C – Gene Ceppetelli, Montreal Alouettes
OG – Charlie Bray, Toronto Argonauts
OG – Bill Danychuk, Hamilton Tiger-Cats
OT – Ed George, Montreal Alouettes
OT – Ellison Kelly, Hamilton Tiger-Cats

Defence
DT – Angelo Mosca, Hamilton Tiger-Cats
DT – Marshall Shirk, Ottawa Rough Riders
DE – Steve Smear, Montreal Alouettes
DE – Ed Harrington, Toronto Argonauts
LB – Charlie Collins, Montreal Alouettes
LB – Jerry Campbell, Ottawa Rough Riders
LB – Mike Widger, Montreal Alouettes
DB – Jim Tomlin, Toronto Argonauts
DB – Garney Henley, Hamilton Tiger-Cats
DB – Al Phaneuf, Montreal Alouettes
DB – Al Marcelin, Ottawa Rough Riders
DB – Marv Luster, Toronto Argonauts

1970 Western All-Stars

Offence
QB – Ron Lancaster, Saskatchewan Roughriders
RB – Silas McKinnie, Saskatchewan Roughriders
RB – Hugh McKinnis, Calgary Stampeders
RB – Jim Evenson, BC Lions
TE – Herman Harrison, Calgary Stampeders
SE – Rick Shaw, Winnipeg Blue Bombers
F – Mike Eben, Edmonton Eskimos
C – Ted Urness, Saskatchewan Roughriders
OG – Jack Abendschan, Saskatchewan Roughriders
OG – Ken Sugarman, BC Lions
OT – Bill Frank, Winnipeg Blue Bombers
OT – Lanny Boleski, Calgary Stampeders

Defence
DT – John Helton, Calgary Stampeders
DT – Greg Pipes, Edmonton Eskimos
DE – Ron Forwick, Edmonton Eskimos
DE – Ken Frith, Saskatchewan Roughriders
LB – Wayne Harris, Calgary Stampeders
LB – Dave Gasser, Edmonton Eskimos
LB – Greg Findlay, BC Lions
DB – John Wydareny, Edmonton Eskimos
DB – Bruce Bennett, Saskatchewan Roughriders
DB – Paul Brule, Winnipeg Blue Bombers
DB – Ted Dushinski, Saskatchewan Roughriders
DB – Joe Hernandez, Edmonton Eskimos

1970 CFL Awards
CFL's Most Outstanding Player Award – Ron Lancaster (QB), Saskatchewan Roughriders
CFL's Most Outstanding Canadian Award – Jim Young (WR), BC Lions
CFL's Most Outstanding Lineman Award – Wayne Harris (LB), Calgary Stampeders
CFL's Coach of the Year – Ray Jauch, Edmonton Eskimos
 Jeff Russel Memorial Trophy (Eastern MVP) – Bill Symons (RB), Toronto Argonauts
 Jeff Nicklin Memorial Trophy (Western MVP) - Ron Lancaster (QB), Saskatchewan Roughriders
 Gruen Trophy (Eastern Rookie of the Year) - Jim Corrigall (DL), Toronto Argonauts
 Dr. Beattie Martin Trophy (Western Rookie of the Year) - John Senst (WR), Winnipeg Blue Bombers
 DeMarco–Becket Memorial Trophy (Western Outstanding Lineman) - Greg Pipes (DT), Edmonton Eskimos

1970 Miss Grey Cup

Miss Montreal Alouettes Nancy Durrell was named Miss Grey Cup 1970, with Miss Edmonton Eskimos Anita Urschel the first runner-up, and Miss Hamilton Tiger-Cats Linda Endicott the second runner-up.  A fourth-year student at McGill University, she received a new 1971 Buick Opel, a mink stole, a diamond watch, a rhinestone tiara, a peignoir set, a stadium coat, a pant suit, boots, a shoulder bag, a Miss Grey Cup brooch, a two-year "keep fit" membership at a health club, and a professional beauty kit.

References

CFL
Canadian Football League seasons